Daniil Vyacheslavovich Kamlashev (born 11 September 2002) is a Russian football player. He plays for FC Volga Ulyanovsk on loan from FC Strogino Moscow.

Club career
He made his debut for FC Khimki on 31 August 2022 in a Russian Cup game against FC Krasnodar.

Career statistics

References

External links
 
 
 
 

2002 births
Footballers from Moscow
Living people
Russian footballers
Association football midfielders
FC Strogino Moscow players
FC Khimki players
FC Volga Ulyanovsk players
Russian Second League players